The 2012-13 Oberliga season was the 54th season for the Oberliga, the third-level ice hockey league in Germany. It was divided into four groups (North, South, East, West). Rote Teufel Bad Nauheim won the championship. A total of 39 teams participated.

Oberliga North

First round

Final round

DEB-Pokal Placement round

Oberliga East

First round

Relegation round
Quarterfinals
FASS Berlin - EHC Crimmitschau 1b 11:2, 18:0, 13:0
Jonsdorfer Falken - ECC Preussen Berlin 5:1, 7:5, 10:3
Tornado Niesky - Wild Boys Chemnitz 6:2, 5:3, 2:1
EHV Schonheide 09 - Black Dragons Erfurt 4:1, 3:2, 4:5 SO, 1:4, 4:1
Semifinals
Jonsdorfer Falken - Tornado Niesky 5:6, 4:1, 2:1, 3:6, 10:3
FASS Berlin - EHC Schonheide 09 2:3 SO, 4:3 OT, 4:2, 3:2 OT
Final
FASS Berlin - Jonsdorfer Falken 6:5, 5:2, 2:1

Oberliga West

First round

Final round

Cup round

Northern Groups final round

Teams

Results 
Group A

Group B

Oberliga South

Qualification-Playoffs 
EC Peiting - Blue Devils Weiden 2:1, 5:6, 5:6 OT, 6:1, 3:5, 3:4 OT
Seiber Wolfe - EV Fussen 2:0, 3:5, 4:1, 3:0, 11:4
Tolzer Lowen - EHC Freiburg 2:3, 5:1, 6:0, 3:9, 7:3, 4:5, 7:2
EV Regensburg - EHC Klostersee 0:1, 3:5, 1:2 OT, 3:8

Relegation round

Playoffs

Quarterfinals
Kassel Huskies - Blue Devils Weiden 6:0, 9:1, 9:4
Seiber Wolfe - Fuchse Duisburg 1:3, 3:0, 1:2, 5:3, 2:1
Rote Teufel Bad Nauheim - EHC Klostersee 3:1, 4:3 SO, 6:5 OT
Tolzer Lowen - Lowen Frankfurt 2:6, 1:7, 3:7

Semifinals
Kassel Huskies - Lowen Frankfurt 5:4 OT, 3:4, 4:3 OT, 2:4, 2:1 OT
Seiber Wolfe - Rote Teufel Bad Nauheim 3:1, 0:5, 0:2, 5:3, 2:4

Final
Kassel Huskies - Rote Teufel Bad Nauheim 5:4 OT, 1:4, 3:2 OT, 3:4, 2:3 OT

External links

 Official website
 Elite Prospects home

Oberliga (ice hockey) seasons
Ice hockey in Germany